

The firs of Denmark

Several species of firs are found in Denmark:
 
Abies alba
Abies amabilis
Abies balsamea
Abies borisii-regis (alba x cephalonica)
Abies cephalonica
Abies concolor
Abies concolor var. lowiana
Abies equi-trojani (nordmanniana ssp. equi-trojani) 
Abies fabri (delavayi var. fabri)
Abies fargesii
Abies faxoniana (delavayi var. faxoniana)
Abies fargesii (var. faxoniana)
Abies firma 
Abies forrestii (delavayi var. forrestii)
Abies fraseri 
Abies grandis
Abies holophylla
Abies homolepis
Abies koreana
Abies lasiocarpa 
Abies lasiocarpa var. arizonica
Abies magnifica
Abies magnifica var. shastensis
Abies mariesii 
Abies nebrodensis (alba ssp. nebrodensis)
Abies nephrolepis 
Abies nordmanniana
Abies nordmanniana subsp. equi-trojani, syn. Abies bornmuelleriana
Abies numidica
Abies pindrow
Abies pinsapo 
Abies pinsapo var. tazaotana
Abies procera
Abies recurvata 
Abies sachalinensis 
Abies sibirica 
Abies sikokiana (veitchii var. sikokiana)
Abies spectabilis
Abies sutchuenensis (fargesii var. sutchuenensis)
Abies veitchii

Lists of plants
Flora of Denmark
Lists of biota of Denmark